Philip William, Prince of Orange (19 December 1554 in Buren, Gelderland – 20 February 1618) was the eldest son of William the Silent by his first wife Anna van Egmont. He became Prince of Orange in 1584 and Knight of the Golden Fleece in 1599.

Biography
Philip William, Filips Willem in Dutch, was born on 19 December 1554 in Buren, Guelders, Seventeen Provinces. He was the first son of William the Silent and Anna van Egmont.

When his father William the Silent ignored Alva's summons to return to Brussels, remaining in Germany, Philip William, only a boy of 13, was studying at the University at Leuven in Brabant. He was seized in February 1568, and taken to Spain partly as a hostage, but especially to be raised as a good Catholic and loyal subject. He would never see his father again (his mother had already died ten years earlier).

In Spain he continued his studies at the university of Alcalá de Henares. He remained in Spain until 1596 when he returned to the southern Netherlands. His interests in the Dutch Republic were vigorously defended by his sister, Maria of Nassau, against his half-brother Maurice of Nassau who contested his brother's right to the barony and city of Breda.

In 1606 Philip William was recognized in the Republic as Lord of Breda and Steenbergen, and his right to appoint magistrates was acknowledged, provided he did so maintaining the "Union and the Republic's religion". He duly made his ceremonial entry into his town of Breda in July 1610 and from then until his death, regularly appointed the magistrates in his lordship. Though he restored Catholic services in the castle of Breda, he did not try to challenge the ascendancy of the Protestant-Calvinist Reformed Church in the city. He had a difference with the States-General in 1613, when they annulled his appointment of a Catholic drost. He had to cooperate with the military governor in Breda, his illegitimate half-brother Justinus van Nassau, staunchly loyal to the States-General.

In 1606 in Fontainebleau, Philip William was married to Eleonora of Bourbon-Condé, daughter of Henry I, Prince de Condé, and cousin of King Henry IV of France, but he died in 1618 without any children. Therefore, Maurice of Nassau could at last inherit the title Prince of Orange.

Philip William died on 20 February 1618 as a consequence of a badly administered enema which gravely injured his intestines. As Lord of Diest and a pious Catholic at the time of his death, Philip William of Orange commanded that the parish church of Saint Sulpice in the same city, should celebrate a yearly Requiem Mass for his soul. Diest is also the site of his burial in the Catholic Roman Rite. Diest is known as the "Orange City", and Philip William as "the Catholic prince of Orange", as his father in 1573 – leading the Dutch Revolt – had become a Calvinist Protestant instead of a Catholic as he had been before.

Ancestors

References

The Dutch Republic. Its Rise, Greatness, and Fall 1477–1806, Jonathan I. Israel, Clarendon Press, Oxford, 1998 . Pages 298–300.
Nos beaux portraits. Faux Tilly et vrai Orange-Nassau. Propos autour du portrait présumé de Philippe-Guillaume d’Orange-Nassau attribué à Frans Pourbus le Jeune, Bernard van de Walle de Ghelcke, in Le Parchemin, Brussels, n° 436, juillet-août 2018, pages 381–436.

External links

|-

1554 births
Counts of Nassau
1618 deaths
People from Buren
Dutch Roman Catholics
16th-century Dutch people
17th-century Dutch people
House of Orange-Nassau
Knights of the Golden Fleece
Lords of Breda
Princes of Orange
University of Alcalá alumni